Alderbrook may refer to:

 Alderbrook (horse), a racehorse

Organisations
 Alderbrook Resort & Spa, resort hotel on Hood Canal in Washington State.
 Alderbrook Secondary School, in Solihull, England
 Alderbrook Winery, in California, US
 Alderbrook Press, publisher of The Lemberg Mosaic

Places
Communities
 Alderbrook (East Sussex), England, in the List of United Kingdom locations: Al
 Alderbrook, New Hampshire, U.S., a former hamlet (c.1844–1909)

Other
 Alderbrook, a mansion in Riverdale, New York City, U.S.
 Alderbrook Farmhouse, in the National Register of Historic Places listings in San Juan County, Washington, U.S.
 Alderbrook Park, Surrey, England, built by Richard Norman Shaw
 Alderbrook Recreation Ground, home of Crowborough Athletic F.C., England
 Union Fishermen's Cooperative Packing Company Alderbrook Station, in the National Register of Historic Places listings in Clatsop County, Oregon, U.S.

See also
 Brook alder, Alnus maritima a species of plant in the family Betulaceae
 Alderbrink Press